Phil Parkes may refer to:

Phil Parkes (footballer, born 1947), English-born goalkeeper for Wolverhampton Wanderers and various clubs in the NASL
Phil Parkes (footballer, born 1950), English international goalkeeper who played for Queens Park Rangers and West Ham United 
Phil Parks, horror novel illustrator (works have appeared in Subterranean Press and Cemetery Dance Publications releases)